The Goguryeo numerals are the numerals of the Goguryeo language. These numerals seem to be similar to the numerals in Old Japanese, suggesting a possible genetic relationship between the two languages. The attested numerals are listed in the following table.

See also
 Classification of the Japonic languages
Peninsular Japonic

References
 
 

 

Puyŏ languages
Goguryeo
Numerals